Boonkua Lourvanij (9 August 1930 – 7 April 2015) was a Thai businessman and sports shooter. He competed at the 1968 Summer Olympics and the 1972 Summer Olympics, was a founding member of the Skeet & Trap Shooting Association of Thailand, and founded and served as CEO of the Asoke Motors Company.

References

1930 births
2015 deaths
Boonkua Lourvanij
Boonkua Lourvanij
Boonkua Lourvanij
Boonkua Lourvanij
Shooters at the 1968 Summer Olympics
Shooters at the 1972 Summer Olympics
Boonkua Lourvanij